In Greco-Roman geography, Iberia (Ancient Greek:  Iberia) was an exonym for the Georgian kingdom of Kartli, known after its core province, which during Classical Antiquity and the Early Middle Ages was a significant monarchy in the Caucasus, either as an independent state or as a dependent of larger empires, notably the Sassanid and Roman empires. Iberia, centered on present-day Eastern Georgia, was bordered by Colchis in the west, Caucasian Albania in the east and Armenia in the south.

Its population, the Iberians, formed the nucleus of the Kartvelians (i.e. Georgians). Iberia, ruled by the Pharnavazid, Artaxiad, Arsacid and Chosroid royal dynasties, together with Colchis to its west, would form the nucleus of the unified medieval Kingdom of Georgia under the Bagrationi dynasty.

In the 4th century, after the Christianization of Iberia by Saint Nino during the reign of King Mirian III, Christianity was made the state religion of the kingdom. Starting in the early 6th century AD, the kingdom's position as a Sassanian vassal state was changed into direct Persian rule. In 580, king Hormizd IV (578-590) abolished the monarchy after the death of King Bakur III, and Iberia became a Persian province ruled by a marzpan (governor).

The term "Caucasian Iberia" is also used to distinguish it from the Iberian Peninsula in Southwestern Europe.

Name

The provenance of the name "Iberia" is unclear. One theory on the etymology of the name Iberia, proposed by Giorgi Melikishvili, was that it was derived from the contemporary Armenian designation for Georgia, Virkʿ (and Ivirkʿ [Իվիրք] and Iverkʿ [Իվերք]), which itself was connected to the word Sver (or Svir), the Kartvelian designation for Georgians. The letter "s" in this instance served as a prefix for the root word "Ver" (or "Vir"). Accordingly, in following Ivane Javakhishvili's theory, the ethnic designation of "Sber", a variant of Sver, was derived from the word "Hber" ("Hver") (and thus Iberia) and the Armenian variants, Veria and Viria.

Historian  argues that the name Iberian was given by Ancient Greeks to two different peoples located at the extremities of their world (in the Iberian Peninsula and the Caucasus) due to the mythical wealth associated with them (Tartessos and the Golden Fleece of Colchis).

History

Early history

In earliest times, the area of Caucasian Iberia was inhabited by several related tribes stemming from the Kura-Araxes culture.

The Saspers (who were mentioned by Herodotus), may have played a crucial role in the consolidation of the tribes inhabiting the area. The Moschoi may have moved slowly to the northeast forming settlements as they traveled. One of these was Mtskheta, the future capital of the Kingdom of Iberia. The Mtskheta tribe was later ruled by a prince locally known as mamasakhlisi (“father of the household” in Georgian).

The written sources for the early periods of Iberia's history are mostly medieval Georgian chronicles, that modern scholarship interpret as a semi-legendary narrative. One such chronicle, Moktsevay Kartlisay (“Conversion of Kartli”) mentions that a ruler named Azo and his people came from Arian-Kartli – the initial home of the proto-Iberians, which had been under  Achaemenid rule until the fall of the Persian Empire – and settled on the site where Mtskheta was to be founded. Another Georgian chronicle, Kartlis Tskhovreba (“History of Kartli”) claims Azo to be an officer of Alexander’s, who massacred a local ruling family and conquered the area, until being defeated at the end of the 4th century BC by Prince Pharnavaz, at that time a local chief.

The story of Alexander's invasion of Kartli, although legendary, nevertheless reflects the establishment of Georgian monarchy in the Hellenistic period and the desire of later Georgian literati to connect this event to the celebrated conqueror.

Pharnavaz I and his descendants
Pharnavaz, victorious in a power struggle, became the first king of Iberia (c. 302 – c. 237 BC). According to the later Georgian chronicles, after driving back an invasion, he subjugated the neighboring areas, including a significant part of the western Georgian state of Colchis (locally known as Egrisi), and seems to have secured recognition of the newly founded state  by the Seleucids of Syria. Pharnavaz is also said to have built a major citadel, the Armaztsikhe, and a temple to the god Armazi, and to have created a new system of administration, subdividing the country into several counties called saeristavos.

His successors controlled the mountain passes of the Caucasus, with the Daryal (also known as the Iberian Gates) being the most important of them.

The period following this time of prosperity was one of incessant warfare as Iberia was forced to defend against numerous invasions into its territories. Some southern parts of Iberia, that were conquered from the Kingdom of Armenia, in the 2nd century BC were reunited to Armenia and the Colchian lands seceded to form separate princedoms (sceptuchoi). At the end of the 2nd century BC, the Pharnavazid king Pharnajom was dethroned by his own subjects and the crown given to the Armenian prince Artaxias who ascended the Iberian throne in 93 BC,  establishing the Artaxiad dynasty of Iberia.

Roman period and Roman/Parthian rivalry

This close association with Armenia and Pontus brought upon the country an invasion (65 BC) by the Roman general Pompey, who was then at war with Mithradates VI of Pontus, and Armenia; but Rome did not establish her power permanently over Iberia. Twenty-nine years later, the Romans again marched (36 BC) on Iberia forcing King Pharnavaz II to join their campaign against Albania.

While another Georgian kingdom of Colchis was administered as a Roman province, Iberia freely accepted the Roman Imperial protection. A stone inscription discovered at Mtskheta speaks of the 1st-century ruler Mihdrat I (AD 58–106) as "the friend of the Caesars" and the king "of the Roman-loving Iberians." Emperor Vespasian fortified the ancient Mtskheta site of Arzami for the Iberian kings in AD 75.

The next two centuries saw a continuation of Roman influence over the area, but by the reign of King Pharsman II (116–132) Iberia had regained some of its former power. Relations between the Roman Emperor Hadrian and Pharsman II were strained, though Hadrian is said to have sought to appease Pharsman. However, it was only under Hadrian's successor Antoninus Pius that relations improved to the extent that Pharsman is said to have even visited Rome, where Dio Cassius reports that a statue was erected in his honor and that rights to sacrifice were given. The period brought a major change to the political status of Iberia with Rome recognizing them as an ally, rather than their former status as a subject state, a political situation which remained the same, even during the Empire's hostilities with the Parthians.

From the first centuries of the Christian era, the cult of Mithras and Zoroastrianism were commonly practiced in Iberia. Excavation of rich burials in Bori, Armazi, and Zguderi has produced silver drinking cups with the impression of a horse either standing at a fire-altar or with its right foreleg raised above the altar. The cult of Mithras, distinguished by its syncretic character and thus complementary to local cults within Georgian mythology, especially the cult of the Sun, gradually came to merge with ancient Georgian beliefs. It is even thought that Mithras must have been the precursor of St. George in pagan Georgia. Step by step, Iranian beliefs and ways of life penetrated deeply the practices of the Iberian court and elite: the Armazian script and “language,” which is based on Aramaic (see Tsereteli), was adopted officially (a number of inscriptions in Aramaic of the Classical/Hellenistic periods are known from Colchis as well); the court was organized on Iranian models, the elite dress was influenced by Iranian costume, the Iberian elite adopted Iranian personal names, and the official cult of Armazi (q.v.) was introduced by King Pharnavaz in the 3rd century BC (connected by the medieval Georgian chronicle to Zoroastrianism)

Between Rome/Byzantium and Persia
Decisive for the future history of Iberia was the foundation of the Sasanian (or Sassanid) Empire in 224 by Ardashir I. By replacing the weak Parthian realm with a strong, centralized state, it changed the political orientation of Iberia away from Rome. Iberia became a tributary of the Sasanian state during the reign of Shapur I (241–272). Relations between the two countries seem to have been friendly at first, as Iberia cooperated in Persian campaigns against Rome, and the Iberian king Amazasp III (260–265) was listed as a high dignitary of the Sasanian realm, not a vassal who had been subdued by force of arms. But the aggressive tendencies of the Sasanians were evident in their propagation of Zoroastrianism, which was probably established in Iberia between the 260s and 290s.

However, in the Peace of Nisibis (298) while the Roman empire obtained control of Caucasian Iberia again as a vassal state and acknowledged the reign over all the Caucasian area, it recognized Mirian III, the first of the Chosroid dynasty, as king of Iberia.

Adoption of Orthodoxy and Sassanid Persian period

Roman predominance proved crucial in religious matters, since King Mirian III and leading nobles converted to Eastern Orthodoxy around 317 and declared Orthodoxy as state religion. The event is related with the mission of a Cappadocian woman, Saint Nino, who since 303 had preached Orthodoxy in the Georgian kingdom of Iberia (Eastern Georgia).

The religion would become a strong tie between Georgia and Rome (later Byzantium) and have a large scale impact on the state's culture and society. Iranian elements in Georgian art gradually ceased with the adoptation of Eastern Orthodoxy in the fourth century.

However, after the emperor Julian was slain during his failed campaign in Persia in 363, Rome ceded control of Iberia to Persia, and King Varaz-Bakur I (Asphagur) (363–365) became a Persian vassal, an outcome confirmed by the Peace of Acilisene in 387. However, a later ruler of Kartli, Pharsman IV (406–409), preserved his country's autonomy and ceased to pay tribute to Persia. Persia prevailed, and Sassanian kings began to appoint a viceroy (pitiaxae/bidaxae) to keep watch on their vassal. They eventually made the office hereditary in the ruling house of Lower Kartli, thus inaugurating the Kartli pitiaxate, which brought an extensive territory under its control. Although it remained a part of the kingdom of Kartli, its viceroys turned their domain into a center of Persian influence. Sasanian rulers put the Christianity of the Georgians to a severe test. They promoted the teachings of Zoroaster, and by the middle of the 5th century Zoroastrianism had become a second official religion in eastern Georgia alongside Eastern Orthodoxy.

The early reign of the Iberian king Vakhtang I dubbed Gorgasali (447–502) was marked by the relative revival of the kingdom. Formally a vassal of the Persians, he secured the northern borders by subjugating the Caucasian mountaineers, and brought the adjacent western and southern Georgian lands under his control. He established an autocephalic patriarchate at Mtskheta, and made Tbilisi his capital. In 482 he led a general uprising against Persia and started a desperate war for independence that lasted for twenty years. He could not get Byzantine support and was eventually defeated, dying in battle in 502.

Fall of the kingdom

The continuing rivalry between Byzantium and Sasanian Persia for supremacy in the Caucasus, and the next unsuccessful insurrection (523) of the Georgians under Gurgen had severe consequences for the country. Thereafter, the king of Iberia had only nominal power, while the country was effectively ruled by the Persians. In 580, Hormizd IV (578–590) abolished the monarchy after the death of King Bakur III, and Iberia became a Persian province ruled by a marzpan (governor). Georgian nobles urged the Byzantine emperor Maurice to revive the kingdom of Iberia in 582, but in 591 Byzantium and Persia agreed to divide Iberia between them, with Tbilisi to be in Persian hands and Mtskheta to be under Byzantine control.

At the beginning of the 7th century the truce between Byzantium and Persia collapsed. The Iberian Prince Stephanoz I (c. 590 – 627), decided in 607 to join forces with Persia in order to reunite all the territories of Iberia, a goal he seems to have accomplished. But Emperor Heraclius's offensive in 627 and 628 brought victory over the Georgians and Persians and ensured Byzantine predominance in western and eastern Georgia until the invasion of the Caucasus by the Arabs.

Arab period and restoration of the kingship

The Arabs reached Iberia about 645 and forced its eristavi (prince), Stephanoz II (637 – c. 650), to abandon his allegiance to Byzantium and recognize the Caliph as his suzerain. Iberia thus became a tributary state and an Arab emir was installed in Tbilisi about 653. At the beginning of the 9th century, eristavi Ashot I (813–830) of the new Bagrationi dynasty, from his base in southwestern Georgia, took advantage of the weakening of the Arab rule to establish himself as hereditary prince (with the Byzantine title kouropalates) of Iberia. A successor, Adarnase IV of Iberia, formally a vassal of Byzantium, was crowned as the “king of Iberia” in 888. His descendant Bagrat III (r. 975–1014), brought the various principalities together to form a united Georgian monarchy.

Eastern and Western Iberians
The similarity of the name with the old inhabitants of the Iberian peninsula, the 'Western' Iberians, has led to an idea of ethnogenetical kinship between them and the people of Caucasian Iberia (called the 'Eastern' Iberians).

It has been advocated by various ancient and medieval authors, although they differed in approach to the problem of the initial place of their origin. The theory seems to have been popular in medieval Georgia. The prominent Georgian religious writer George the Hagiorite (1009–1065) wrote about the wish of certain Georgian nobles to travel to the Iberian peninsula and visit the local Georgians of the West, as he called them.

See also
 Georgian monarchs family tree of Iberia
 Colchis
 Roman Georgia
 Sasanian Iberia

References

Sources

Further reading
 Roger Rosen, Jeffrey Jay Foxx. Georgia: A sovereign country of the Caucasus
 Thomson, Robert W. Rewriting Caucasian History (1996) 
 Braund, David. Georgia in Antiquity: A History of Colchis and Transcaucasian Iberia, 550 BC-AD 562 (New York: Oxford University Press, 1994) 
 Lang, David Marshall. The Georgians (London: Thames & Hudson, 1966)
 Toumanoff, Cyril. Studies in Christian Caucasian History. Washington D.C.: Georgetown University Press, 1963
 Edward Gibbon, Volume II, Chapter XLII, discusses Iberia as one of the areas in the "Barbaric world"

 
States and territories established in the 4th century BC
580 disestablishments
Provinces of the Sasanian Empire
Former countries in Western Asia
Former countries in Europe
Roman client kingdoms
302 establishments
States and territories disestablished in the 6th century
Former kingdoms